Koleč is a municipality and village in Kladno District in the Central Bohemian Region of the Czech Republic. It has about 600 inhabitants.

Administrative parts
Villages of Mozolín and Týnec are administrative parts of Koleč.

Geography
It lies in the Prague Plateau.

History
The first written mention of Koleč is in a document from about 1125–1140, when it was stated to be in property of the Vyšehrad Chapter. The village of Týnec was first mentioned in a forgery from the 12th century. The village of Mozolín was first mentioned in the 18th century. The most significant owner of Koleč was the Italian noble Ubelli family. They acquired Koleč in 1701 or 1702 and had built here a castle.

Sights

The Koleč Castle is a small Baroque castle built in 1711–1713. The Chapel of the Holy Trinity was added in 1714. The chapel was later enlarged into a church. The castle fell into disrepair in the 1990s. Today it is gradually reconstructed.

References

External links

 

Villages in Kladno District